Weekend Love may refer to:

 "Weekend Love" (Spice Girls song) 2000
 "Weekend Love" (Queen Latifah song) 1993
  "Weekend Love" a 1979 song by Golden Earring